Arthur M. Poskanzer (28 June 1931 in New York City – 30 June 2021 in Berkeley, California) was an experimental physicist, known for his pioneering work on relativistic nuclear collisions.

Poskanzer received in 1953 his bachelor's degree in physics and chemistry from Harvard University and in 1954 his master's degree in chemistry from Columbia University. In 1957 he received his Ph.D. from Massachusetts Institute of Technology in physical chemistry. His doctoral advisor was Charles Coryell. From 1957 to 1966 Poskanzer was a chemist at Brookhaven National Laboratory. From 1966 he worked as a scientist at Lawrence Berkeley National Laboratory (LBL) and remained on the staff there until 2001, when he retired with emeritus status. From 1978 to 1979 he was the scientific director of Bevalac. From 1980 to 1990 he was the leader of the Plastic Ball Experimental Group, which was part of a collaboration between LBL and GSI Helmholtz Centre for Heavy Ion Research (GSI). From 1990 to 1995 he was the head of the Relativistic Collisions Program at LBL.

He is famous as one of the co-discoverers of what nuclear physicists call collective flow; this phenomenon consists of fluidic motion exhibited by nuclear matter, such as quarks and gluons, when compressed to a physical state of high temperature and high energy-density. This discovery was made during the collaboration between LBL and GSI.

For the academic year 1970/71 he was a Guggenheim Fellow at the University of Paris-Sud in Orsay. He was several times a visiting scientist at CERN (in 1979/80, in 1986/87 and in 1995/96, with the latter two visiting years each supported by Alexander von Humboldt Senior US Scientist Awards).

He married in 1954 and upon his death in 2021 was survived by his widow, their three children, and four grandchildren.

Honors and awards
1976 — elected a Fellow of the American Physical Society
1979 — American Chemical Society Award in Nuclear Chemistry
1992 — elected a Fellow of the American Association for the Advancement of Science
2008 — Tom W. Bonner Prize in Nuclear Physics

References

External links
Berkeley Lab Photo Archive : XBD9810-02631.TIF (Plastic Ball Experimental Group)

1931 births
2021 deaths
21st-century American chemists
21st-century American physicists
American nuclear physicists
Harvard College alumni
Columbia University alumni
Massachusetts Institute of Technology School of Science alumni
Fellows of the American Physical Society
Fellows of the American Association for the Advancement of Science
People from New York City
Lawrence Berkeley National Laboratory people
People associated with CERN